"There's a Star-Spangled Banner Waving Somewhere" is a patriotic anthem written in 1942 by Paul Roberts and Shelby Darnell (a pseudonym for producer Bob Miller). With Elton Britt's version selling well over one million copies, the song was country music's greatest World War II hit, though Your Hit Parade would not feature the song in its original country music format.

History
The song was completed, along with other tunes, on Swan's Island, Maine, where Paul Roberts visited and performed with his soon to become wife, Annie Marrithew, during World War II.  The song enjoyed its greatest popularity during the war years.  The somewhere in the title of the song refers to an idealistic version of heaven reserved for the brave U.S. soldiers fighting the Axis Powers, somewhat akin to the concept of Valhalla.  The verses are a narrative of a young disabled man, who still yearns to fight and earn his place in this patriotic afterlife.

Elton Britt's version was recorded in 1942 with President Roosevelt asking Britt to perform the song for him at the White House. Jimmy Wakely recorded a version in June 1942. Gene Autry sang the song on his "Sergeant Gene Autry Show." on Sunday, August 16, 1942.

Other versions

Other lyrics to this melody have been recorded by Red River Dave in 1960 and called Ballad of Francis Powers. This is a song about the U.S. flier, Francis Gary Powers, who has been shot down on a spy mission over Soviet territory and taken POW; he is shown singing There's A Star-Spangled Banner Waving Somewhere in prison.

Numerous performers have recorded "There's a Star-Spangled Banner Waving Somewhere" through the years. One of the most successful versions was recorded by country music artist Elton Britt, whose version reached No. 7 on the Billboard magazine's pop chart in 1942. Another recording was made by country singer Wynn Stewart, on his 1968 Capitol Records album In Love.

Outsider musician Peter Grudzien recorded a gay-themed version of the song on his album The Unicorn in 1974; this recording was featured on the 2000 compilation Songs in the Key of Z.

References

Bibliography

External links 
There's A Star-Spangled Banner Waving Somewhere lyrics
Ballad of Francis Powers lyrics

American patriotic songs
Songs of World War II
1942 songs
1942 singles
North American anthems